The 2002–03 season was Ulster Rugby's eighth under professionalism, and their second under head coach Alan Solomons. They competed in the Heineken Cup and the Celtic League. No IRFU Interprovincial Championship was held this season.

In the Celtic League, they finished third in Pool A, qualifying for the playoffs. They beat Glasgow in the quarter-finals, but lost to Munster in the semi-finals. In the Heineken Cup, they finished third in Pool 6, missing out on the knockout stage. Bryn Cunningham was Ulster's Player of the Year. Flanker Neil McMillan won the IRUPA Young Player of the Year award.

Staff

Pre-season

Players in
  Neil Best from Belfast Harlequins
  Nigel Brady from Dungannon
  Warren Brosnihan from Natal Sharks
  Robbi Kempson from Western Province
  David Spence from Queen's University

Players out
  David Allen (released)
  Robby Brink (retired)
  Mark Crick (work permit expired)
  Leopoldo de Chazal (released)
  Brad Free (emigrated)
  Mike Haslett to London Irish
  Paddy Johns (retired)
  Aidan Kearney to Leinster
  Niall Malone (released)
  Richie Weir (released)

Squad

2002–03 Heineken Cup

Pool 6

2002-03 Celtic League

Pool A

Quarter final

Semi-final

Ulster Rugby Awards

The Ulster Rugby Awards ceremony was held at the Ramada Hotel on 15 May 2003. Winners were:

Ulster Player of the Year: Bryn Cunningham
Guinness Rugby Personality of the Year: Allen Clarke
Club Ulster Supporters Player of the Year: Robbi Kempson
Schools Player of the Year: Andrew Trimble, Coleraine Academical Institution
Club Team of the Year: Ballymena R.F.C.
Dorrington Faulkner Award: Ivan Coffey
Club PRO: John Dickson
Youth Player of the Year: Stephen Ferris
Coach of the Year: Tom McGaw
Club of the Year: Ballynahinch RFC
Merit Award: Scott Gardiner, Monaghan Rugby Club

References

2002-03
Ulster
Ulster
Ulster